Deforge or DeForge or Deforges is a surname. Notable people with the surname include: 

André Deforge (1914–1996), French racing cyclist
Anna DeForge (born 1976), American basketball player
Michael DeForge (born 1987), Canadian comics artist and illustrator
Régine Deforges (1935–2014), French author, editor, director, and playwright